Creature Beat was a United Kingdom new wave band from the 1970s, based in Bristol and London. The band released a single with Puritan Records. The band split up in 1984, and later released an album of its previous songs almost 30 years later.

Discography
 "Creature Beat" b/w "She Won't Dance" (single) by Puritan Records
 Live Oxford 1981 (album) by Bristol Archive Records

Line up
 Simon James, vocals
 Wade Featherstone, drums
 James Winstone, drums (1978-1981)
 Andrew Andrews, percussion, vibes, backing vocals
 Matthew James, guitar, backing vocals
 Nigel Harrison, bass guitar
 James McMillan, trumpet
 Deborah Keeping, keyboard

References

English new wave musical groups